Xylopia quintasii is an evergreen tree, of the family Annonaceae that grows 20-25 metres tall. Xylopia quintasii can tolerate temperatures above at least 1°C. Its leaves are oblanceolate and petiolate. Xylopia quintasii produces six star-shaped flowers. Xylopia quintasii is native to West Africa.  It is known as Aghako in Ghana and Mvomba in Cameroon.

Distribution
Xylopia quintasii is found in most of North-Western Africa. This species is present in the following countries:

Uses

Xylopia quintasii is not commonly sold on the international market and is usually only used for local purposes. It is sometimes used in Grains of Selim and is smoked. The wood of Xylopia quintasii is used for house building in posts, poles, and planks. It can also have other uses like bowls, plates, weapons, tools, toys, etc.  Many parts of Xylopia quintasii are used in traditional medicine. The bark is used to treat illnesses like bronchitis and pneumonia. The inner bark is used to treat swellings. A lotion can be prepared from the bark to treat headaches.

References

quintasii